Charlie Constable (born 18 May 1999) is a professional Australian rules footballer playing for the Gold Coast Suns in the Australian Football League (AFL), having been initially drafted to .

Early life
Constable played junior football for East Sandringham and Haileybury, before he was selected to play for the Sandringham Dragons in the TAC Cup.  He played for Vic Country in 2017 AFL Under 18 Championships where he achieved All-Australian honours.  Constable was drafted with pick 36 in the 2017 AFL draft by the Geelong Football Club.

AFL career
After spending the 2018 season in the VFL, Constable made his debut in round 1 of the 2019 AFL season against , having 21 disposals and kicking a goal.  For his round 2 performance against , where he has 31 disposals and a goal, Constable was nominated for the 2019 AFL Rising Star award.

Statistics
Statistics are correct to the end of 2022 AFL season

|-
|- 
! scope="row" style="text-align:center" | 2019
|style="text-align:center;"|
| 18 || 7 || 5 || 2 || 63 || 87 || 150 || 31 || 26 || 0.7 || 0.3 || 9.0 || 12.4 || 21.4 || 4.4 || 3.7
|-
! scope="row" style="text-align:center" | 2020
|style="text-align:center;"|
| 18 || 2 || 0 || 1 || 13 || 22 || 35 || 4 || 8 || 0.0 || 0.5 || 6.5 || 11.0 || 17.5 || 2.0 || 4.0
|- 
! scope="row" style="text-align:center" | 2021
|style="text-align:center;"|
| 18 || 3 || 1 || 0 || 21 || 16 || 37 || 13 || 3 || 0.3 || 0.0 || 7.0 || 5.3 || 12.3 || 4.3 || 1.0
|-
! scope="row" style="text-align:center" | 2022
|style="text-align:center;"|
| 33 || 2 || 0 || 0 || 4 || 0 || 4 || 2 || 0 || 0.0 || 0.0 || 2.0 || 0.00 || 1.0 || 0.0 || 0
|- class="sortbottom"
! colspan=3| Career
! 14
! 6
! 3
! 101
! 125
! 226
! 50
! 37
! 0.4
! 0.2
! 7.2
! 8.9
! 16.1
! 3.6
! 2.6
|}

Notes

References

External links

1999 births
Living people
People educated at Haileybury (Melbourne)
Geelong Football Club players
Sandringham Football Club players
Australian rules footballers from Victoria (Australia)